Karasu is a village in the Kostanay Region, Kazakhstan. It is the administrative center and the only significant inhabited place of Karasu District (KATO code - 395230100). Population:

Geography

References

Populated places in Kostanay Region